The Women's Shot Put F33-34/52/53 had its Final held on September 15 at 9:10.

Medalists

Results

References
Final

Athletics at the 2008 Summer Paralympics
2008 in women's athletics